Stanfieldiella is genus of flowering plants within the family Commelinaceae, first described in 1960. It is native to sub-Saharan Africa.

 Species
 Stanfieldiella axillaris J.K.Morton - Ghana, Nigeria
 Stanfieldiella brachycarpa (Gilg & Ledermann ex Mildbr.) Brenan - from Nigeria to Congo
 Stanfieldiella imperforata (C.B.Clarke) Brenan - from Liberia to Ghana; also Angola
 Stanfieldiella oligantha (Mildbr.) Brenan - from Liberia to Gabon

References and external links 

Commelinaceae
Commelinales genera